The Lebanese records in swimming are the fastest ever performances of swimmers from Lebanon, which are recognized and ratified by the Lebanese Swimming Federation.

All records were set in finals unless noted otherwise.

Long Course (50 m)

Men

Women

Mixed relay

Short Course (25 m)

Men

Women

Mixed relay

See also 
 Lebanese Swimming at the Olympics

References

Lebanon
Records
Swimming
Swimming